The Poacher (German: Der Wildschütz or Die große Schuld) is a 1953 Austrian-German drama film directed by Alfred Lehner and starring Renate Mannhardt, Kurt Heintel and Karl Fischer.

Cast

References

Bibliography 
 Fritsche, Maria. Homemade Men in Postwar Austrian Cinema: Nationhood, Genre and Masculinity. Berghahn Books, 2013.

External links 
 

1953 films
1953 drama films
Austrian drama films
German drama films
West German films
1950s German-language films
Austrian black-and-white films
German black-and-white films
Films directed by Alfred Lehner
1950s German films